The British courtroom drama television series Judge John Deed, starring Martin Shaw as a maverick High Court judge, began with a pilot episode called "Exacting Justice", which was first broadcast on BBC One on 9 January 2001. The series proper began on 26 November 2001. The first to third series contained four 90-minute episodes, the fourth and fifth were extended to a six-episode run and the latest series comprised two 120-minute episodes split into two parts on broadcast. When it began, the programme followed an episodic format, though later series have developed a serialised format, with plots developing over a number of stories.

As of the end of the sixth series in 2007, the number of episodes is 29. The possibility of more episodes was in doubt after Shaw became involved in other projects, and the series had been officially cancelled by the BBC by 2009. The pilot and all 6 series have been released on DVD in the UK (minus episodes 24 & 25). The pilot and first series were released in North America in March 2010.

Series overview

Episodes

Series 1 (2001)

Series 2 (2002)

Series 3 (2003–04)

Series 4 (2005)

Series 5 (2006)

Series 6 (2007)

Broadcast history

Notes and references

"Judge John Deed episode guide". bbc.co.uk

Judge John Deed episodes